Richard Christopher Mangam (December 21, 1841 – November 18, 1893) was a Private in the United States Army and a Medal of Honor recipient for his role in the American Civil War.

Medal of Honor citation
Rank and organization: Private, Company H, 148th New York Infantry. Place and date: At Hatchers Run, Va., April 2, 1865. Entered service at: ------. Birth: Ireland. Date of issue: September 21, 1888.

Citation:

Capture of flag of 8th Mississippi Infantry (C.S.A.).

See also
List of American Civil War Medal of Honor recipients: M–P

Notes

References

 

1841 births
1893 deaths
19th-century Irish people
Irish soldiers in the United States Army
People of New York (state) in the American Civil War
United States Army Medal of Honor recipients
Union Army soldiers
Irish-born Medal of Honor recipients
Irish emigrants to the United States (before 1923)
American Civil War recipients of the Medal of Honor
People from Worcester, New York